Jaunjelgava Parish is an administrative unit of Aizkraukle Municipality, Latvia. Until 2021, it was part of the former Jaunjelgava Municipality. Jaunjelgava Parish was created in 2010 from the countryside territory of Jaunjelgava town. At the beginning of 2015, the population of the parish was 98. Latvian law defines Jaunjelgava Parish as a part of the region of Selonia.

Towns, villages and settlements of Jaunjelgava parish

References

Parishes of Latvia
Aizkraukle Municipality
Selonia